{{Infobox person
| name = Jack Thompson
| image = Jack Thompson speaks at the media (cropped).jpg
| caption = Thompson in 2014
| birth_name = John Hadley Pain
| birth_date = 
| birth_place = Manly, New South Wales, Australia
| death_date = 
| death_place = 
| years_active = 1968–present
| spouse = Leona King
| children = 2
| occupation = Actor
| agent = DPN
| awards = * Inductee into the Australian Film Walk of Fame (2011)
 Chauvel Award (2006)
 Film Living Legend Award (2005)
 Critics Circle of Australia Award For Contribution to Australian Cinema (1998)
 Logie Hall of Fame (1995)
 Raymond Longford Award (1994)
 Australian Film Institute Award Best Actor - Breaker Morant (1980)
 Cannes Award Best Supporting Actor -  Breaker Morant (1980)
 Hoyts Prize for Best Performance - Sunday Too Far Away (1975)}}Jack Thompson, AM (born John Hadley Pain'; 31 August 1940) is an Australian actor and a major figure of Australian cinema, particularly Australian New Wave. He was educated at University of Queensland, before embarking on his acting career. In 2002, he was made an honorary member of the Australian Cinematographers Society (ACS). He is best known as a lead actor in several acclaimed Australian films, including such classics as The Club (1980), Sunday Too Far Away (1975), The Man from Snowy River (1982) and Petersen (1974). He won Cannes and AFI acting awards for the latter film. He was the recipient of a Living Legend Award at the 2005 Inside Film Awards.

 Early life 
Born John Hadley Pain in Manly, a suburb of Sydney, Thompson was three years old when his mother died, leaving his father, a merchant seaman, unable to care for him and his brother, David. He was sent to "LakeHouse orphanage" in Narrabeen by his aunt and subsequently adopted by the poet and ABC broadcaster John Thompson and his wife Pat, after which he changed his surname. Jack is film reviewer Peter Thompson's adopted brother.

Thompson was educated at Sydney Boys High School. He left school at 14, and became a jackaroo in the Northern Territory, as well as taking labouring jobs in New South Wales.

Career
Theatre
After working in an agricultural lab, Thompson joined the army in 1960 so that he could earn a science degree. He enrolled at the University of Queensland in 1963 and transferred to an arts degree, performing in theatre at night, including the Twelfth Night Theatre and UQ Dramatic Society in Brisbane.

His talent was nurtured and developed at the Producers Authors Composers and Talent (PACT) Centre.

He appeared on stage in The Devils in 1968.

Early television appearances
Thompson decided to take acting seriously, giving himself twelve months to make a go of it. His TV career began with the soap opera Motel (1968), and guest appearances on Riptide, Woobinda, Animal Doctor, Skippy, The Rovers, Division 4, Homicide and Matlock Police. He also appeared in a documentary short Personnel, or People? (1969), directed by Donald Crombie. Thompson made his film debut in That Lady from Peking (1968). He played the lead in a TV movie Silo 15 (shot in 1969, released 1971).

Spyforce
Thompson took the lead role in spy drama series Spyforce (1971–73), playing the role of Erskine who did missions in World War II.

Thompson also had a key support role in the film Wake in Fright (1971). He continued to guest star on shows such as Over There, Matlock Police (again), Ryan, Boney and Elephant Boy.

Thompson received excellent reviews for his performance in one of the stories in Libido (1973); his segment was written by David Williamson.

He starred in a TV movie Linehaul (1973), playing a truckie, and guest starred on The Evil Touch and Homicide again; he also appeared in Marijuana: Possession and the Law (1974).

Film stardom
Thompson became an Australian film star playing the title role in Petersen (1974), written by Williamson and directed by Tim Burstall. The film was a success at the box office. He did a TV movie Human Target (1974) then starred in another highly acclaimed Australian film, Sunday Too Far Away (1975) playing a shearer.

Thompson played the title role in Scobie Malone (1975), based on the Jon Cleary novel Helga's Web. It was produced by American Casey Robinson who said "Jack Thompson is a great part of my reason to become involved in this venture. I have no doubt whatsoever that when this film is seen overseas he'll be turned instantly into an international star. There aren't many male actors like him around any more. There's something there that reminds me very much of Bogart." The film was a failure at the box office.

He did an episode of Armchair Theatre shot in Australia, "Tully".

Thompson had a support role in Caddie (1976), directed by Crombie, which was a big success.

Thompson had become nationally famous playing "macho" type roles. "I think it reflects
its time so accurately," he said later. "There was a preoccupation with the macho Australian male, it's a thing that had to be examined or purged in film."

Character actor
Thompson then deliberately decided to take character parts, out of a fear of typecasting and "also an understanding that unless I could get out of that target area, then I wouldn't be allowed to be seen as an actor."

He guest starred in an episode of Luke's Kingdom and played the second lead in Mad Dog Morgan (1976) with Dennis Hopper. He took some time off to work on a script with his brother then had a key support role in The Chant of Jimmie Blacksmith (1978). He supported imported stars Karen Black and Keir Dullea in a TV movie shot in Australia, Because He's My Friend (1978).

Thompson returned to acting after another break to play the lead role in a sex comedy, The Journalist (1979). "I haven't made any films since then because I haven't liked the parts I've been offered, and also I've been too busy promoting the Australian film industry overseas", said Thompson at the time. The film became a notorious flop. He worked on a script with his brother called Welcome Stranger.

He was offered a role in Breaker Morant (1980), directed by Bruce Beresford - the part of Private Hancock. Thompson turned it down, Beresford rewrote the script and offered him the part again, and Thompson accepted. Then filming was delayed. John Hargreaves who was to play the lawyer became unavailable; Thompson took that part and Bryan Brown played Hancock. The film was a considerable success. Thompson won Best Supporting Actor at Cannes.

Thompson supported US stars William Holden and Rick Schroeder in The Earthling (1980) then was top billed in The Club (1980), directed by Beresford from a play by Williamson.

"You get awfully fed up with the public image that you must live up to," he said in an interview around this time. "I just want to continue becoming a part of the Australian film industry, not for materialistic reasons but because I enjoy it. I not only want to act, but produce and possibly direct".

Thompson went to New Zealand to make Bad Blood (1982) playing killer Stanley Graham, then had a support role in The Man from Snowy River (1982), playing Clancy of the Overflow.

International career
Thompson went overseas to support Ingrid Bergman in A Woman Called Golda (1982). He was Lee Remick's husband in a remake of The Letter (1982) and played a British POW in Merry Christmas Mr. Lawrence (1983) with David Bowie and Tom Conti.

Back in Australia Thompsons starred in a mini series about wharfies in the Depression, Waterfront (1983). He went to Europe to star in a swashbuckler for Paul Verhoeven, Flesh + Blood (1985), then returned to Australia to star in Burke and Wills (1985). This film was a box office disappointment.

Thompson supported Linda Evans and Jason Robards in a TV mini series The Last Frontier (1986) which was a huge ratings success. In the US he had a role in Kojak: The Price of Justice (1987) then returned home to play an ASIO officer in Ground Zero (1987).

Thompson was a love interest for Stefanie Powers in Beryl Markham: A Shadow on the Sun (1988) on US TV and had the lead in an Australian TV movie, The Riddle of the Stinson (1989), playing Bernard O'Reilly.

He co-starred with Raquel Welch in Trouble in Paradise (1989) for US TV then did a mini series in New Zealand, The Rainbow Warrior Conspiracy (1989).

He did a US TV movie After the Shock (1990) and had a support part in Turtle Beach (1992) and Wind (1992).

Character actor
Thompson began to increasingly work as a character actor in the US with roles in Ruby Cairo (1993), directed by Graeme Clifford, and A Far Off Place (1994).

He returned to Australia to play Russell Crowe's father in The Sum of Us (1994) then did A Woman of Independent Means (1995) in the US and Flight of the Albatross (1995) in New Zealand.

He had a support role in Broken Arrow (1996), did The Thorn Birds: The Missing Years (1996) back home and Last Dance (1996) for Beresford in the US.

Thompson starred in the Australian TV movie McLeod's Daughters (1996). He was Alicia Silverstone's father in Excess Baggage (1997), then did Under the Lighthouse Dancing (1997) in Australia. He appeared in the Clint Eastwood-directed Midnight in the Garden of Good and Evil (1997) as Sonny Seiler, the attorney of Kevin Spacey's character, Jim Williams. (Seiler himself appeared in the movie as the judge in Williams' trial.)

Back in Australia Thompson provided a voice for The Magic Pudding (2000) and appeared in Yolngu Boy (2001). He had a support part in the new version of South Pacific (2001), the mini series based on My Brother Jack (2001), Original Sin (2001), Star Wars: Episode II - Attack of the Clones (2002), The Assassination of Richard Nixon (2004), and Oyster Farmer (2005).

Thompson had a key role in two films directed by Brett Leonard: the Marvel Comics based Man-Thing (2005) and Feed (2006), the latter written by and starring his son.

Thompson had support roles in The Good German (2006), Bastard Boys (2007), December Boys (2007), Leatherheads (2008), Ten Empty (2008), Australia (2008), Mao's Last Dancer (2009) for Beresford, The Karenskys (2009), Don't Be Afraid of the Dark (2010), Rake (2010), Blinder (2013), The Great Gatsby (2013), Mystery Road (2013), Around the Block (2013), Bonnie & Clyde (2013) for Beresford, Devil's Playground (2014), Ruben Guthrie (2015), The Light Between Oceans (2016), Don't Tell (2017), Blue World Order (2017) and Swinging Safari (2018).

He has also acted in television miniseries and appeared as the host of the Channel 7 factual series Find My Family.

Other appearances
Thompson was the first nude male centrefold in Cleo in 1972. He has also appeared in television commercials, including as the face of the Bank of Melbourne for a decade, and for Claytons. Thompson is featured in a series of recordings of Australian poetry, reciting poems by Henry Lawson, Banjo Paterson, C. J. Dennis, Patrick Joseph Hartigan (aka John O'Brien) and John O'Grady. (see Discography below). Interviewed in the Sydney Morning Herald he explains his love of poetry, noting that 'Poetry is sometimes seen as too arty and perhaps not a suitable interest for blokes.'

Personal life
Thompson married Beverley Hackett in 1963, and the five-year marriage produced his son Patrick Thompson. He met Leona King and her sister Bunkie in 1969, and they entered into a 15-year polyamorous relationship with them. Leona was 20 and Bunkie was 15 when the relationship began. Bunkie left the relationship in 1985, and is estranged from her sister. Leona remained with Thompson, and gave birth to his second son, Billy.

Thompson featured in the first episode of the Australian version of Who Do You Think You Are?, which was televised on 13 January 2008 on SBS, with Thompson discovering that his great-grandfather was Captain Thomas Pain, and his great-great uncle was Alfred Lee, a prominent figure in Sydney society, who donated the journal of Joseph Banks, from Captain Cook's navigation to Australia in the 1770s, to the Mitchell Library in Sydney. 

Thompson used to own Hotel Gearin in Katoomba, Blue Mountains. He sold the hotel in June 2011.

 Filmography 
Film

Television

Awards

 1975 AFI Award: Best Actor, for Sunday Too Far Away and Petersen 1980 AFI Award: Best Actor in a Lead Role, for Breaker Morant 1980 Cannes Film Festival: Best Supporting Actor, for Breaker Morant 1986 Appointed a Member of the Order of Australia for services to the Australian film industry
 1994 AFI Award: Raymond Longford Award
 1998 Film Critics Circle of Australia Awards: Special Achievement Award
 2005 Inside Film Awards: Living Legend IF Award
 2011 Australian Film Festival: Inductee into the Australian Film Walk of Fame

Thompson also served as an UNHCR Goodwill Ambassador.

Discography
 Jack Thompson: The Bush Poems of A.B. (Banjo) Paterson (Audio recording)|The Bush Poems of A.B. (Banjo) Paterson (2008)
 Jack Thompson: The Campfire Yarns of Henry Lawson (2009)
 Jack Thompson: The Sentimental Bloke, The Poems of C.J. Dennis (2009)
 Jack Thompson: The Battlefield Poems of A.B (Banjo) Paterson (2010)
 Jack Thompson: Favourite Australian Poems (2010)
 Jack Thompson: The Poems of Henry Lawson (2011)
 Jack Thompson: Live at the Gearin Hotel (DVD & CD) (2011)
 Jack Thompson: The Poems of Lewis Carroll (2011)
 Jack Thompson: Live at the Lighthouse CD'' (2011)

References

External links

 
 
 
 
 Jack Thompson reads Australian Poetry on Fine Poets recordings
 Listen to Jack Thompson read Clancy of the Overflow 

1940 births
Living people
20th-century Australian male actors
21st-century Australian male actors
Australian adoptees
Australian male film actors
Australian male television actors
Members of the Order of Australia
Best Actor AACTA Award winners
Cannes Film Festival Award for Best Actor winners
Logie Award winners
Male actors from Sydney
United Nations High Commissioner for Refugees Goodwill Ambassadors
People educated at Sydney Boys High School
People from Manly, New South Wales